Bathymodiolus is a genus of deep-sea mussels, marine bivalve molluscs in the family Mytilidae. Many of them contain intracellular chemoautotrophic bacterial symbionts.

Species
Modern (non-fossil) species within the genus Bathymodiolus include:

 Bathymodiolus childressi Gustafson, Lutz, Turner & Vrijenhoek, 1998
 Bathymodiolus japonicus Hashimoto & Okutani, 1994
 Bathymodiolus marisindicus Hashimoto, 2001
 Bathymodiolus platifrons Hashimoto & Okutani, 1994
 Bathymodiolus septemdierum Hashimoto & Okutani, 1994
 Bathymodiolus tangaroa Von Cossel & Marshall, 2003
 Bathymodiolus thermophilus Kenk & Wilson, 1985

There also are several fossil species, which are usually only tentatively assigned to hydrothermal vent and hydrocarbon seep-inhabiting mussel genera due to their conservative shell morphology and ongoing taxonomic revision of this group. They include:

 Bathymodiolus (sensu lato) heretaunga Saether, Little, Campbell, Marshall, Collins & Alfaro, 2010
 Bathymodiolus (sensu lato) inouei Amano & Jenkins, 2011
 Bathymodiolus palmarensis Kiel, Campbell & Gaillard, 2010

References

 
Bivalve genera
Chemosynthetic symbiosis